Bryan Maris Stephens (July 14, 1920 – November 21, 1991) was an American professional baseball player. The native of Fayetteville, Arkansas, a right-handed pitcher, appeared in 74 Major League games — 31 for the  Cleveland Indians and 43 for the  St. Louis Browns.

Stephens attended Washington High School in Los Angeles County, California, and signed with the Detroit Tigers in 1939. The following season he was acquired by the Indians and spent 1940–1942 in their farm system, winning 20 of 24 decisions in 1942 for the Class B Cedar Rapids Raiders of the Illinois–Indiana–Iowa League. He then missed the 1943–1945 seasons while serving in the United States Army during World War II. After one more year of minor league seasoning in 1946, Stephens made the 1947 Indians' roster.

In his first Major League appearance, as a starting pitcher on May 15 against the Washington Senators at Griffith Stadium, Stephens scattered eight hits, all singles, in a complete game, 9–1 triumph over eventual Baseball Hall of Fame pitcher Early Wynn. Sent to the bullpen by manager Lou Boudreau, Stephens then went over a month before his next starting assignment — again at Washington and against Wynn. This time, on June 19, Stephens took the loss, 3–2, and left for a pinch hitter after the fifth inning. Altogether, he made five starts for Cleveland was used exclusively as a relief pitcher after July 15. He fashioned a 5–10 win–loss mark and a 4.01 earned run average, with one save, in 92 innings pitched for the Indians.

Stephens was traded on November 20, 1947, with $25,000, Joe Frazier, and Dick Kokos for Walt Judnich and Bob Muncrief. Stephens worked out of the bullpen early in the 1948 season before making six successive starts during June; however, he lost his first four decisions before throwing another complete game, a 9–6 win over the Boston Red Sox at Sportsman's Park, winning the game himself by driving in three runs with an eighth-inning double off Mel Parnell.  (Bryan Stephens was one of three players with a similar surname who played in that game, including Boston's Vern Stephens and the Browns' first baseman, Chuck Stevens.) But Bryan Stephens' year with the Browns had few bright spots: he collected three saves and posted three wins, against six losses, with a poor 6.02 earned run average in  innings pitched.  He spent the next two seasons, his last as a professional, in the minors.

All told, Stephens allowed 220 hits and 106 bases on balls in  Major League innings pitched, with 69 strikeouts.

References

External links

1920 births
1991 deaths
Baltimore Orioles (IL) players
Baseball players from Arkansas
Baseball players from California
Cedar Rapids Raiders players
Charleston Senators players
Cleveland Indians players
Henderson Oilers players
Los Angeles Angels (minor league) players
Major League Baseball pitchers
Oakland Oaks (baseball) players
St. Louis Browns players
San Antonio Missions players
Tacoma Tigers players
Wilkes-Barre Barons (baseball) players
United States Army personnel of World War II